Koushik Sen (born 19 September 1968) is an Indian actor of film, television and theatre based in Kolkata. He is the director of the well-acclaimed theatre group Swapnasandhani. He has won the BFJA awards for best supporting actor for his performance in the Mrinal Sen directed film Aamar Bhuvan.

Personal life
Koushik Sen was born on 19 September 1968. He is the son of actress Chitra Sen and actor Shyamal Sen. He studied at the Julien Day School, and graduated from Scottish Church College, both in Kolkata. Sen is married to Reshmi Sen (a theatre personality) and has a son, Riddhi Sen.

Stage performance 

From 1992, he is the director of Bengali theatre group Swapnasandhani. The group has staged more than 35 plays and they mainly perform in Sujata Sadan. Koushik has acted with Soumitra Chatterjee in the play Tiktiki.

In 2010, the group staged the play Birpurush, which was inspired by Rabindranath Tagore's poem, but it was a political play and dealt with the contemporary context of West Bengal. The play stirred up some controversies.

Works

Filmography

Plays 

 Taraye Taraye based on Srijato's Tara Bhora Akasher Niche
 Nirbhaya based on Bertolt Brecht's Mother Courage and Her Children
 Macbeth (also performed at Bharat Rang Mahotsav)
 Jal Chhabi (debut)
 Tikitiki
 Punoscho
 Bhalo Rakkhosher Golpo

Television 
 Kalpurush
 Asamapto (2005)
 E Kamon Meye (2005)
 Tiktiki
 Uro Megh
 Gaaner Oparey
 Swapath
 Raaikishori (2014)
 Byomkesh (2014 TV series)
 Sindoorkhela
Moinaker er Upakhyan
 Godhuli Alap

Web series

Awards
2003 BFJA Award in the category best actor in supporting role, for the film Aamar Bhuvan.

See also
Debesh Chattopadhyay
Arpita Ghosh
Suman Mukhopadhyay
Bratya Basu
Sujan Mukhopadhyay
Shreyan Chattopadhyay

References

External links

Living people
Male actors in Bengali cinema
Bengali male actors
Bengali Hindus
Film directors from Kolkata
Male actors from Kolkata
Scottish Church College alumni
University of Calcutta alumni
Indian theatre directors
Indian male stage actors
1968 births
Bengali theatre personalities
Indian male film actors
20th-century Indian male actors
21st-century Indian male actors